Fabienne Beret-Martinel, born 22 December   1977, is a  French athlete specialising in the sprints.

Prize list  
 Champion of France in 2006 for 200 m  
 Champion of France in 2006 for indoor 60m: (7.30)   
 4th in championships of France in Rouen in the sotteville (11.34) in 2004   
 3rd in 400m relay at Athens Olympic Games in 2004 with the French relay Christine Arron, Murielle Hurtis, Veronique Mang, Sylviane Felix and Fabé Dia. They finished in 3rd place.   
 Finalist and second leg runner of 4 × 100m at 2006 European Athletics Championships (Beside Véronique Mang,  Adrianna Lamalle  &  Muriel Hurtis). The French team was forced to abandon the race in the last leg of the relay due to an injury of the third leg Adrianna Lamalle   
   2007 World Athletics Championships to Osaka  (Japan)  
 eliminated in the semifinals of the relay 4 × 100 m

References

External links  
 

French female sprinters
1977 births
Living people